"I Don't Think That I Like Her" is a song by American singer Charlie Puth. Released on September 16, 2022, through Atlantic Records as the fifth single from his third studio album, Charlie (2022), the song was written by Puth, along with Jacob Kasher, Blake Slatkin, and Jake Torrey, and produced by Puth.  The song features Travis Barker on drums.

Composition and lyrics 
"I Don't Think That I Like Her" is set in the key of B major (and later modulates to C# major) with a tempo of 186 beats per minute. Uproxx describes the song as "triumphant, [...] showcasing his incredible register". The song sees Puth discuss past relationships that "instilled a sense of paranoia in him", making his future in dating very uncertain.

Charts

Weekly charts

Monthly charts

References 

Charlie Puth songs
2022 songs
2022 singles